Singburi Bangrajun Football Club (Thai สโมสรฟุตบอลจังหวัดสิงห์บุรี ) is a Thailand semi professional football club based in Singburi province. They currently play in Thai League 3 Northern region.

Stadium and locations

Seasons

P = Played
W = Games won
D = Games drawn
L = Games lost
F = Goals for
A = Goals against
Pts = Points
Pos = Final position

QR1 = First Qualifying Round
QR2 = Second Qualifying Round
R1 = Round 1
R2 = Round 2
R3 = Round 3
R4 = Round 4

R5 = Round 5
R6 = Round 6
QF = Quarter-finals
SF = Semi-finals
RU = Runners-up
W = Winners

External links 
 Official Website
 Official Fanpage
 Official Facebookpage

Association football clubs established in 2009
Football clubs in Thailand
2009 establishments in Thailand